Major General Md Nurul Anwar ndc, hdmc, afwc, psc, G is a two-star general of the Bangladesh Army. He is incumbent the Director General of Department of Immigration and Passports, Dhaka. Prior to that, he was General-Officer-Commanding (GOC) of 55th Infantry Division & Area Commander, Jashore Area.

Career 
Anwar was commissioned in the Bangladesh Army on 22 June 1990 in the Corps of Artillery. In his bright career, Anwar served as Director General of Operations and Plan Directorate of the Armed Forces Division when he was Brigadier General. He led the Exercise Sampriti-10 a joint training with Indian Army in Jashore Cantonment. He performed United Nations assignments twice. Once in Kuwait and another one in Democratic Republic of Congo.   

Anwar also served at ninth artillery brigade before he promoted to Major General. Currently he is the Chairman of Governing body of Military Collegiate School Khulna and Army Medical College, Jashore.

References 

Bangladesh Army generals
Bangladeshi generals
Year of birth missing (living people)
Living people